Alexander Chuka Iwobi (born 3 May 1996) is a Nigerian professional footballer who plays as a midfielder for  club Everton and the Nigeria national team.

Iwobi began his career at Arsenal, making 149 appearances and scoring 15 goals, and winning the FA Cup in 2017, as well as scoring in the 2019 UEFA Europa League Final. In August 2019, he transferred to Everton for an initial £28 million fee.

Iwobi represented England up to under-18 level. He made his senior international debut for Nigeria in October 2015, and was part of their squads at the FIFA World Cup in 2018 and the Africa Cup of Nations in 2019 and 2021, finishing third at the 2019 tournament.

Early and personal life
Iwobi was born in Lagos before moving to England at the age of four, following a brief stay in Turkey, and grew up in Newham, London. His maternal uncle is former professional footballer Jay-Jay Okocha.

Club career

Arsenal

Iwobi joined Arsenal while still at primary school, in 2004, and was nearly released by the club at the age of 14 and again at the age of 16.

He was first involved in a first-team match as an unused substitute in a League Cup match against West Bromwich Albion on 25 September 2013. He signed a long-term contract with Arsenal in October 2015.

On 27 October 2015, Iwobi made his first-team debut for the club, starting in a 3–0 defeat to Sheffield Wednesday in the Round of 16 of the League Cup. He made his Premier League debut four days later in a 3–0 win against Swansea City at the Liberty Stadium, as a stoppage time substitute for Mesut Özil. Iwobi made his Champions League debut as an 85th-minute substitute in a 5–1 defeat against Bayern Munich. Iwobi started in the first team for the 2015–16 FA Cup 3rd and 4th round home wins against Sunderland and Burnley respectively.

After getting a first Champions League start in a 3–1 away defeat to Barcelona, Iwobi went on to score two goals in his first two Premier League starts in wins against Everton, and Watford, respectively.

In the following season, Iwobi changed his squad number from 45 to 17, after Alexis Sánchez took number 7 from the departing Tomáš Rosický. He went on to feature throughout Arsenal's victorious FA Cup campaign of 2016–17, winning 2–1 against Chelsea in the final. He achieved further success with Arsenal in the 2017 Community Shield, in which Arsenal beat Chelsea on penalties.

In January 2018, a video was released that allegedly showed Iwobi at a late-night party 36 hours before a match. In May 2018, after Arsenal manager Arsène Wenger announced he would be leaving the club, Iwobi described him as an "inspiration" and stated it was sad but exciting.

In August 2018, he signed a new long-term contract with the club, reportedly until 2023.

In January 2019, Iwobi was the subject of alleged racism from Indian actress Esha Gupta, an Arsenal ambassador.

In May 2019 he scored Arsenal's only goal in the 2019 UEFA Europa League Final, in a 4–1 defeat to Chelsea.

In July 2019, after the 2019 Africa Cup of Nations, he said he was looking forward to returning to club football with Arsenal.

Everton
On 8 August 2019, Iwobi signed a five-year contract with Everton. According to the BBC, Arsenal received a fee of an initial £28 million, rising to £34 million with potential add-ons.

Fifteen days after signing, Iwobi made his debut as a substitute for the final half-hour in place of Gylfi Sigurðsson in a 2–0 loss at Aston Villa. On 28 August in the second round of the EFL Cup, he scored his first Everton goal in a 4–2 win at Lincoln City. He scored his first league goal on 1 September in a 3–2 win over Wolverhampton Wanderers, and was one of two players singled out for praise by manager Marco Silva afterwards.

International career

Eligible to represent England or his birth country Nigeria, Iwobi started as a youth international for England, with whom he won the 2011 Victory Shield. Iwobi earned 11 caps for England at underage level, but went on to declare for Nigeria in 2015. He made his senior debut for the Super Eagles on 8 October, replacing Ahmed Musa in the 57th minute of a 2–0 friendly defeat to DR Congo in Visé, Belgium.

He was selected by Nigeria for their 35-man provisional squad for the 2016 Summer Olympics. He was not a part of the 18-man final squad.

In August 2017 Iwobi pulled out of Nigeria's squad for that month's World Cup qualifiers due to injury. In October 2017, Iwobi scored for Nigeria in a 1–0 win over Zambia to secure the Super Eagles a spot in the 2018 FIFA World Cup in Russia. He was named in Nigeria's 23-man squad for the competition and featured in all three games as the Super Eagles were knocked out in the group stage.

In April 2019, he said he wanted to emulate his uncle Jay-Jay Okocha by winning the Africa Cup of Nations. He was included in Nigeria's squad for the 2019 tournament. At the tournament he said he would ignore the labelling of Nigeria as favourites. After the tournament he said he was looking forward to returning to club football with Arsenal.

Iwobi was named in the Nigeria squad for the delayed 2021 Africa Cup of Nations in 2022. He was given a red card five minutes after coming on as a substitute in the knockout stage match against Tunisia, a match Nigeria lost 0–1.

Career statistics

Club

International

As of match played 9 June 2022. Scores and results list Nigeria's goal tally first.

Honours
Arsenal
FA Cup: 2016–17
FA Community Shield: 2015, 2017
EFL Cup runner-up: 2017–18
UEFA Europa League runner-up: 2018–19

England U16
Victory Shield: 2011

Nigeria
Africa Cup of Nations: third place 2019

Individual
CAF Youth Player of the Year: 2016
CAF Team of the Year: 2016 (as a substitute)

References

External links

 Profile at the Everton F.C. website

1996 births
Living people
Sportspeople from Lagos
English footballers
England youth international footballers
Nigerian footballers
Nigeria international footballers
Association football midfielders
Association football wingers
Arsenal F.C. players
Everton F.C. players
Premier League players
2018 FIFA World Cup players
2019 Africa Cup of Nations players
2021 Africa Cup of Nations players
English people of Nigerian descent